Julio Ramón Gómez Pando (born December 29, 1959 in Santander, Cantabria) is a retired boxer from Spain. He represented his native country at the 1984 Summer Olympics in Los Angeles, California. There, he was stopped in the first round of the flyweight division (– 51 kg) by Colombia's Álvaro Mercado.

External link
Spanish Olympic Committee

1959 births
Living people
Sportspeople from Santander, Spain
Boxers from Cantabria
Flyweight boxers
Boxers at the 1984 Summer Olympics
Olympic boxers of Spain
Spanish male boxers